Cathepsin B belongs to a family of lysosomal cysteine proteases known as the cysteine cathepsins and plays an important role in intracellular proteolysis. In humans, cathepsin B is encoded by the CTSB gene. Cathepsin B is upregulated in certain cancers, in pre-malignant lesions, and in various other pathological conditions.

Structure

Gene
The CTSB gene is located at chromosome 8p22, consisting of 13 exons. The promoter of CTSB gene contains a GC-rich region including many SP1 sites, which is similar to housekeeping genes. At least five transcript variants encoding the same protein have been found for this gene.

Protein
Cathepsin B is synthesized on the rough endoplasmic reticulum as a preproenzyme of 339 amino acids with a signal peptide of 17 amino acids. Procathepsin B of 43/46 kDa  is then transported to the Golgi apparatus, where cathepsin B is formed. Mature cathepsin B is composed of a heavy chain of 25-26 kDa and a light chain of 5kDa, which are linked by a dimer of disulfide.

Function 

Cathepsin B may enhance the activity of other proteases, including matrix metalloproteinase, urokinase (serine protease urokinase plasminogen activator), and cathepsin D, and thus it has an essential position for the proteolysis of extracellular matrix components, intercellular communication disruption, and reduced protease inhibitor expression. It is also involved in autophagy and catabolism, which is advantageous in tumor malignancy, and it is possibly involved in specific immune resistance. Additionally, it was recently determined to have minor ligase activity with the ability to attach peptide fragments via an amide bond.

Clinical significance

Cathepsin B has been proposed as a potentially effective biomarker for a variety of cancers. Overexpression of cathepsin B is correlated with invasive and metastatic cancers.
Cathepsin B is produced in muscle tissue during metabolism.  It is capable of crossing the blood–brain barrier and is associated with neurogenesis, specifically in the mouse dentate gyrus.
A wide array of diseases result in elevated levels of cathepsin B, which causes numerous pathological processes including cell death, inflammation, and production of toxic peptides. Focusing on neurological diseases, cathepsin B gene knockout studies in an epileptic rodent model have shown cathepsin B causes a significant amount of the apoptotic cell death that occurs as a result of inducing epilepsy. 

Cathepsin B inhibitor treatment of rats in which a seizure was induced resulted in improved neurological scores, learning ability and much reduced neuronal cell death and pro-apoptotic cell death peptides. Similarly, cathepsin B gene knockout and cathepsin B inhibitor treatment studies in traumatic brain injury mouse models have shown that cathepsin B to be key to causing the resulting neuromuscular dysfunction, memory loss, neuronal cell death and increased production of pro-necrotic and pro-apoptotic cell death peptides.  In ischemic non-human primate and rodent models, cathepsin B inhibitor treatment prevented a significant loss of brain neurons, especially in the hippocampus.  In a Streptococcus pneumoniae meningitis rodent model, cathepsin B inhibitor treatment greatly improved the clinical course of the infection and reduced brain inflammation and inflammatory Interleukin-1β (IL1-β) and tumor necrosis factor-α (TNF-α).  

In a transgenic Alzheimer's disease (AD) animal model expressing human amyloid precursor protein (APP) containing the wild-type beta-secretase site sequence found in most AD patients or in guinea pigs, which are a natural model of human wild-type APP processing, genetically deleting the cathepsin B gene or chemically inhibiting cathepsin B brain activity resulted in a significant improvement in the memory deficits that develop in such mice and reduces levels of neurotoxic full-length Abeta(1-40/42) and the particularly pernicious pyroglutamate Abeta(3-40/42), which are thought to cause the disease. In a non-transgenic senescence-accelerated mouse strain, which also has APP containing the wild-type beta-secretase site sequence, treatment with bilobalide, which is an extract of Gingko biloba leaves, also lowered brain Abeta by inhibiting cathepsin B. Moreover, siRNA silencing or chemically inhibiting cathepsin B in primary rodent hippocampal cells or bovine chromaffin cells, which have human wild-type beta-secretase activity, reduces secretion of Abeta by the regulated secretory pathway.
Mutations in the CTSB gene have been linked to tropical pancreatitis, a form of chronic pancreatitis.

Interactions 
Cathepsin B has been shown to interact with:
CTSD
 CSTA,
 CSTB, and
 S100A10.
Cathepsin B is inhibited by:
Nitroxoline
CA-074

See also 
Cathepsins

References

Further reading

External links 
 The MEROPS online database for peptidases and their inhibitors: C01.060
 

EC 3.4.22
Proteases
Extracellular matrix remodeling enzymes
Cathepsins